Yeray Álvarez López (born 24 January 1995), known simply as Yeray, is a Spanish professional footballer who plays for Athletic Bilbao as a centre-back.

Club career
Born in Barakaldo, Biscay, Basque Country, Yeray joined Athletic Bilbao's youth setup at Lezama in 2008, aged 13. He played in the 2012–13 NextGen Series with the Juvenil A side, and made his debut as a senior with CD Basconia (the farm team) in the following season, in Tercera División.

On 26 May 2014, Yeray was promoted to the reserves who competed in Segunda División B. He contributed with 36 appearances and one goal during the campaign – play-offs included – as they returned to Segunda División after a 19-year absence.

Yeray played his first professional game on 24 August 2015, coming on as a second-half substitute for Jurgi Oteo in a 1–0 home loss against Girona FC. He was a regular starter during that season, but the side were immediately relegated back as dead last.

In the 2016 pre-season, Yeray was promoted to the main squad, and he made his competitive debut on 15 September of that year when he played the full 90 minutes in a 0–3 away defeat to U.S. Sassuolo Calcio in the group stage of the UEFA Europa League. His maiden La Liga appearance took place three days later, replacing Eneko Bóveda in a 2–1 home win over Valencia CF.

Yeray subsequently became a regular starter for the Lions, appearing in 17 out of a possible 20 matches in all competitions. Due to the nature of his progression through the youth departments, he held the unusual distinction of having played in a different league every season from 2008 to 2016 without interruption: five youth year levels ending with the División de Honor Juvenil de Fútbol, fourth level with Basconia, divisions two and three with the reserves and top tier with the senior team. However, the run was halted abruptly on 23 December 2016, when the club announced he had been diagnosed with testicular cancer and would undergo surgery within the next week; he returned to action on 4 February 2017 after only 46 days, playing the full 90 minutes in a 3–0 away loss to FC Barcelona, and five days later, he extended his contract until 2022.

On 12 June 2017, tests found further cancerous abnormalities, resulting in Yeray having to undergo chemotherapy treatment. On his return to the club's training centre the following month, he was greeted by the entire playing squad, who had all shaved their heads in a gesture of solidarity.

On 20 December 2017, Yeray captained the Athletic under-23s in a win over Swansea City in the Premier League International Cup (a reserves tournament). 259 days after his last appearance, he made his return with the senior team on 4 February 2018 (exactly one year after his first comeback match, both fixtures by strange coincidence taking place on World Cancer Day), playing the entirety of a 0–2 domestic league defeat away to Girona.

Yeray agreed to a new seven-year deal on 18 July 2019, keeping him at the San Mamés Stadium until 2026 and with a release clause set at €70m. He scored his first competitive goal for the first team on 25 January 2021, heading home a cross from Iker Muniain for his team's second in an eventual 5–1 home win against Getafe CF.

International career
On 23 March 2017, Yeray made his debut for the Spain under-21 team in a friendly match against Denmark. He was selected in the squad for that year's UEFA European Championships, before withdrawing due to illness prior to the start of the tournament.

Even though he was not part of the squad of 23 for the 2018 FIFA World Cup finals, Yeray was picked by full side manager Julen Lopetegui for a friendly with Switzerland to be held on 3 June. He remained an unused substitute in the 1–1 draw.

Yeray also played for the unofficial Basque Country team, making his debut against Costa Rica in November 2020.

Career statistics

Club

Honours
Athletic Bilbao
Supercopa de España: 2020–21
Copa del Rey runner-up: 2019–20, 2020–21

References

External links
 (archive)

1995 births
Living people
Spanish footballers
Footballers from Barakaldo
Association football defenders
La Liga players
Segunda División players
Segunda División B players
Tercera División players
Danok Bat CF players
CD Basconia footballers
Bilbao Athletic footballers
Athletic Bilbao footballers
Spain under-21 international footballers
Basque Country international footballers